Center Stage is a live album by Australian guitarist Tommy Emmanuel that was recorded at Sierra Nevada Brewery in Chico, California for the PBS television series Sierra Center Stage. It was released on CD in April 2008 and on DVD in October 2008.

Track listing

Charts

References

Tommy Emmanuel albums
2008 live albums
Favored Nations albums
Live albums by Australian artists